Vijay Kumar (born 7 November 1954) is an Indian molecular biologist, virologist and an honorary scientist at the International Centre for Genetic Engineering and Biotechnology. Known for his research in hepatology, Kumar is an elected fellow of National Academy of Sciences, India, National Academy of Medical Sciences, and National Academy of Agricultural Sciences as well as a J. C. Bose National Fellow of the Department of Biotechnology. The Council of Scientific and Industrial Research, the apex agency of the Government of India for scientific research, awarded him the Shanti Swarup Bhatnagar Prize for Science and Technology, one of the highest Indian science awards for his contributions to Medical Sciences in 1997.

Biography 

Vijay Kumar was born on 7 November 1954 at Sasaram, a place known for its quarries, in Rohtas district in the Indian state of Bihar. His early college education was at Sahibganj College of Tilka Manjhi Bhagalpur University from where he completed his BSc (Hons) in zoology in 1972 and earned an MSc from Magadh University in 1975. Subsequently, he joined the All India Institute of Medical Sciences, Delhi as a junior research fellow and continued there for his doctoral studies as a Lady Tata Senior Research Scholar to secure a PhD in 1984 for his thesis, Molecular interactions of progesterone with its receptor in human uterus. He started his career the same year by joining AIIMS faculty as a junior research officer at the department of biophysics but took a sabbatical to move to Institut de Chimie Biologique, Strasbourg as an exchange scholar of Louis Pasteur University and did his post-doctoral studies till 1988. Returning to India, he joined International Centre for Genetic Engineering and Biotechnology (ICGEB), New Delhi as a research scientist where he served out his regular career till his superannuation in 2014. During this period, he held various positions such as senior research scientist (1998–2001), staff research scientist (2002–13), staff scientist (2013–14) and headed the Virology Group from 2013 to 2014. Post-retirement, he continues his association with ICGEB as an emeritus scientist and as J. C. Bose National Fellow.

Legacy 

Vijay Kumar focused his research on the assembly, cloning and expression of genes and on the role played by steroid hormone receptors as well as oncogenic viruses in producing cancer cells. He has done pioneering research on Hepatitis B virus and his studies widened the understanding of the trans-activating domain of the HBx protein. He contributed in developing a protocol for assembling multiepitope protein gene which assisted in the studies of the immunobiology of the virus. His research collaboration with Debi Prasad Sarkar assisted him to demonstrate for the first time that HBx protein stimulated Mitogen-activated signaling cascades in vivo. His research has been documented and cited in texts and articles
 and he has contributed chapters to books published by others.

Kumar is a member of the Institutional Ethics Review Board (IERB-JNU) of the Jawaharlal Nehru University and was a member of the Advisory Committee for Shanti Swarup Bhatnagar Prize for the years, 2005, 2011 and 2014. He served as a principal investigator for a number of projects by Department of Science and Technology and Department of Biotechnology. The invited lectures or key note addresses delivered by him include the presentation on Epigenetic control of origin licensing during mammalian DNA replication at the Indian Science Congress of 2012 among others.

Awards and honors 
Kumar won a number of prizes during his academic studies which included the Kul Prize for Best Science graduate of Bhagalpur University (1972), DPI Merit Scholarship during 1973–75 and the Gold Medal of Magadh University in 1977 for standing first in MSc examination. The Council of Scientific and Industrial Research awarded him Shanti Swarup Bhatnagar Prize, one of the highest Indian science awards in 1997. The list of research fellowships held by him features Lady Tata Senior Research Scholarship of Lady Tata Memorial Trust (1982–84), Indo-French Scientific and Cultural Exchange Fellowship (1984–85) and the J. C. Bose National Fellowship of the Department of Biotechnology in 2013. He received the Gold Medal of the Zoological Society of India in 1998. In 2002 he was elected as a fellow by the National Academy of Sciences, India. The National Academy of Agricultural Sciences elected him as a fellow in 2004 and he became a fellow of the National Academy of Medical Sciences in 2013. The award orations delivered by him include the 2013 Ramniklal J. Kinarivala Oration Award of Gujarat Cancer Society.

Selected bibliography

See also 

 Epitope mapping
 Viral protein

Notes

References

External links 
 

1954 births
Living people
People from Sasaram
Indian molecular biologists
Indian virologists
Indian medical writers
Magadh University alumni
All India Institute of Medical Sciences, New Delhi alumni
Academic staff of the All India Institute of Medical Sciences, New Delhi
Recipients of the Shanti Swarup Bhatnagar Award in Medical Science
Fellows of The National Academy of Sciences, India
Fellows of the National Academy of Agricultural Sciences
Fellows of the National Academy of Medical Sciences
Scientists from Bihar
People from Rohtas District
Tilka Manjhi Bhagalpur University alumni